Good Morning Country is a syndicated Australian country music radio show, broadcasting each weekday from 5am to 9am. It is presented by the Community Broadcasting Association of Australia and is hosted by Kevin Walsh, Georgie Cadwallader and Kylie Adams-Collier.

External links

References

Australian radio programs
Australian country music radio programs